The Boutonne is a  long river in the Deux-Sèvres and Charente-Maritime departments in western France. Its source is in the village of Chef-Boutonne. It flows generally southwest. It is a right tributary of the Charente into which it flows near Cabariot.

Departments and communes along its course
This list is ordered from source to mouth:
Deux-Sèvres: Chef-Boutonne, Fontenille-Saint-Martin-d'Entraigues, Chérigné, Lusseray, Brioux-sur-Boutonne, Vernoux-sur-Boutonne, Séligné, Brieuil-sur-Chizé, Villefollet, Villiers-sur-Chizé, Chizé, Le Vert
Charente-Maritime: Dampierre-sur-Boutonne, Saint-Séverin-sur-Boutonne, Coivert, Blanzay-sur-Boutonne, Saint-Georges-de-Longuepierre, Saint-Martial, Saint-Pierre-de-l'Isle, Nuaillé-sur-Boutonne, Saint-Pardoult, Les Églises-d'Argenteuil, Antezant-la-Chapelle, Vervant, Poursay-Garnaud, Courcelles, Saint-Julien-de-l'Escap, Saint-Jean-d'Angély, Ternant, La Vergne, Voissay, Torxé, Les Nouillers, Tonnay-Boutonne, Puy-du-Lac, Archingeay, Saint-Coutant-le-Grand, Champdolent, Lussant, Cabariot,

References

Rivers of France
Rivers of Nouvelle-Aquitaine
Rivers of Deux-Sèvres
Rivers of Charente-Maritime